Viers may refer to:

Viers, Virginia, an unincorporated community in Dickenson County, Virginia, United States
Thad Viers (born 1978), American politician